Kangiqtugaapik (Inuktitut syllabics: ᑲᖏᖅᑐᒑᐱᒃ) formerly Clyde Inlet is a body of water in eastern Baffin Island, Qikiqtaaluk Region, Nunavut. Its mouth opens into the Davis Strait from the west.

The Inuit community of Clyde River is located on the inlet's Patricia Bay. The community is a popular launching-off point for remote big wall climbing on the east coast of Baffin. The nearby fiords are home to many granite walls with some established routes and plenty of space for new first ascents.

Geography

Kangiqtugaapik
Kangiqtugaapik, is the northern branch.

Inugsuin Fiord

See also
List of fjords in Canada

References

External links
 Photo, ice breaker in Clyde Inlet

Inlets of Baffin Island